In Greek mythology, Aegeus (Ancient Greek: Αἰγεύς) is the eponymic hero of the phyle called the Aegeidae at Sparta. He was a son of Oeolycus, and grandson of Theras, the founder of the colony in Thera. All the Aegeïds were believed to be Cadmeans, who formed a settlement at Sparta previous to the Dorian conquest. There is only this difference in the accounts, that, according to some, Aegeus was the leader of the Cadmean colonists at Sparta, while, according to Herodotus, they received their name of Aegeids from the later Aegeus, the son of Oeolycus. There was at Sparta a heroon of Aegeus.

Notes

References 

 Herodotus, The Histories with an English translation by A. D. Godley. Cambridge. Harvard University Press. 1920. Online version at the Topos Text Project. Greek text available at Perseus Digital Library.
 Pausanias, Description of Greece with an English Translation by W.H.S. Jones, Litt.D., and H.A. Ormerod, M.A., in 4 Volumes. Cambridge, MA, Harvard University Press; London, William Heinemann Ltd. 1918. . Online version at the Perseus Digital Library
Pausanias, Graeciae Descriptio. 3 vols. Leipzig, Teubner. 1903.  Greek text available at the Perseus Digital Library.
 Pindar, Isthmian Odes translated by Diane Arnson Svarlien. 1990. Online version at the Perseus Digital Library.
 Pindar, Pythian Odes translated by Diane Arnson Svarlien. 1990. Online version at the Perseus Digital Library.
 Pindar, The Odes of Pindar including the Principal Fragments with an Introduction and an English Translation by Sir John Sandys, Litt.D., FBA. Cambridge, MA., Harvard University Press; London, William Heinemann Ltd. 1937. Pythian Odes: Greek text available at the Perseus Digital Library.  Isthmian Odes: Greek text available at the Perseus Digital Library.

Characters in Greek mythology